The Amsterdam Museum, known until 2010 as the Amsterdam Historical Museum, is an Amsterdam-based museum dedicated to the city's past and present. Due to the renovation of its main location, the museum is temporarily located in the building the Amstelhof on the Amstel River, together with the Hermitage Amsterdam and the dependence of the Museum van de Geest.

History
The museum opened in 1926 in the Waag, one of Amsterdam's 15th-century city gates. It has been located since 1975 in a former convent that was used from 1581 onwards as Amsterdam's municipal orphanage. The building was extended by Hendrick and his son Pieter de Keyser, then rebuilt by Jacob van Campen in 1634. The orphanage operated in this building until 1960.`

Collection
The museum exhibits various items related to the history of Amsterdam, from the Middle Ages to the present time. Many of the original furnishings of the city orphanage are on display, as are artifacts relating to the Rasp house, the former house of correction in Amsterdam where the prisoners were forced to rasp wood to make sawdust. As of 2011, the museum manages 70,000 objects kept in various buildings and storage areas. Of those, approximately 25,000 have been photographed and are available to the public online. To celebrate the change of their name (dropping the word "Historical") and the 10th anniversary of Wikipedia on January 15, 2011, the museum "gave" Wikipedia a USB stick with the online photo collection to symbolize the public release of their high quality digital photographs made of their collection. This includes all two-dimensional objects that were already free of copyright, but new is the set photos of three-dimensional art.

The museum has on display paintings, models, archeological findings, photographs, but also less likely items such as a playable carillon, a Witkar (environment-friendly vehicle from the 1960s) and a replica of Café 't Mandje (a famous pub in the Red-light district where prostitutes, pimps, seamen and lesbian women came together).

References

External links
Amsterdam Museum

 
City museums in the Netherlands
Local museums in the Netherlands
History museums in the Netherlands
History of Amsterdam
Museums established in 1975
Museums in Amsterdam
Rijksmonuments in Amsterdam